Ithaca Pottery Site is an archaeological site located at Ithaca in Tompkins County, New York.

The site is the location of a pottery factory owned by Elijah Cornell active between 1825 and 1849.

It was listed on the National Register of Historic Places in 1979.

References

Tompkins County, New York
Archaeological sites on the National Register of Historic Places in New York (state)
National Register of Historic Places in Tompkins County, New York